The 1908 University of Utah football team was an American football team that represented the University of Utah as an independent during the 1908 college football season. In its fifth season under head coach Joe Maddock, the team compiled a 4–2–1 record and outscored all opponents by a total of 206 to 49. The team played its home games at Cummings Field in Salt Lake City. Fullback "Dad" Covill was the team captain.

Utah met Idaho for the first time, in the season finale on Thanksgiving.

Schedule

References

University of Utah
Utah Utes football seasons
University of Utah football